Yannis Takerboucht (born 3 February 1993 in France) is a French footballer.

References

French footballers
Living people
Association football defenders
1993 births
FCM Aubervilliers players
RC Arbaâ players
AS Poissy players